The following is a list of notable deaths in May 2022.

Entries for each day are listed alphabetically by surname. A typical entry lists information in the following sequence:
 Name, age, country of citizenship at birth, subsequent country of citizenship (if applicable), reason for notability, cause of death (if known), and reference.

May 2022

1
James A. Andersen, 97, American politician, member of the Washington House of Representatives (1959–1967) and Senate (1967–1973).
Millie Bailey, 104, American World War II veteran (WAC) and civil servant.
Naftali Blumenthal, 100, Polish-born Israeli politician, MK (1981–1984).
Kathy Boudin, 78, American political activist and convicted murderer, cancer.
Bertha Conton, 98, Sierra Leonean educator.
Ray Freeman, 90, British chemist.
Ilan Gilon, 65, Israeli politician, MK (1999–2003, 2009–2021).
Ángela Hernández, 31, Colombian politician, lawyer and journalist, breast cancer.
Freddy Johnston, 86, Scottish journalist.
Dominique Lecourt, 78, French philosopher.
Mike Liles, 76, American politician, member of the Tennessee House of Representatives (1991–1995).
Rajshekhar Mansur, 79, Indian classical vocalist.
Takuya Miyamoto, 38, Japanese footballer (Cerezo Osaka, Montedio Yamagata, Avispa Fukuoka).
Carlos Eduardo Moreira Ferreira, 83, Brazilian businessman and politician, deputy (1999–2003).
Henry Coke Morgan Jr., 87, American federal judge, Eastern District of Virginia (since 1992).
Jim Murphy, 74, American author (The Long Road to Gettysburg, Blizzard! The Storm That Changed America, The Call of the Wolves).
Ivica Osim, 80, Bosnian football player (Željezničar) and manager (Yugoslavia national team, Sturm Graz), heart attack.
Ric Parnell, 70, English drummer (Atomic Rooster, Spinal Tap) and actor (This Is Spinal Tap).
Charles Siebert, 84, American actor (Trapper John, M.D., ...And Justice for All, One Day at a Time), complications from COVID-19.
Sally Siegrist, 70, American politician, member of the Indiana House of Representatives (2016–2018).
Roberta Tomber, 68, British archaeologist.
Josephine Tsang Sau-ho, 62, Hong Kong politician, member of the Islands District Council (since 2014), suicide.
Jerry verDorn, 72, American actor (One Life to Live, Guiding Light), cancer.
Michel Vinaver, 95, French writer and dramatist.
Régine Zylberberg, 92, Belgian-born French singer and nightclub owner.

2
Max Boyes, 87, British Olympic hurdler (1960).
Ursula Braun-Moser, 84, German politician, MEP (1984–1989, 1990–1994).
María José Cantilo, 68, Argentine singer-songwriter.
Roberto Chapula de la Mora, 66, Mexican politician, member of the Congress of Colima (2000–2003, 2006–2009, since 2021), shot.
Gianfranco De Bosio, 97, Italian film director (The Terrorist, In Love, Every Pleasure Has Its Pain) and screenwriter.
Vitali Dzerbianiou, 45, Belarusian Olympic weightlifter (2008).
Jean-Marie Faux, 98–99, Belgian Jesuit author, translator and theologian.
Biancamaria Frabotta, 75, Italian writer.
Peter Frohmader, 63, German composer, musician and visual artist.
Nield Gordon, 91, American college basketball coach (Winthrop Eagles).
João Gago Horta, 79, Portuguese businessman and politician, MP (2002–2005). (death announced on this date)
Jan Kostrhun, 79, Czech writer and politician, MP (1996–2002).
Axel Leijonhufvud, 88, Swedish economist.
Kailia Posey, 16, American beauty pageant and reality show contestant (Toddlers & Tiaras), suicide.
Joseph Raz, 83, Israeli philosopher.
Đuro Seder, 94, Croatian painter.
John Richard Smoak Jr., 78, American federal jurist, Judge of the U.S. District Court for Northern Florida (since 2005).
James V. Stanton, 90, American politician, member of the U.S. House of Representatives (1971–1977).
Rob Stein, 78, American political strategist.
Alzina Toups, 94, American chef.
Norvald Tveit, 94, Norwegian writer and playwright.
Radim Uzel, 82, Czech sexologist and academic, complications from stomach cancer.
Yuri Vasenin, 73, Russian football player (Zaria Voroshilovgrad, Soviet Union national team) and manager (Baltika Kaliningrad).

3
Egidio Alagna, 86, Italian politician, deputy (1983–1992).
Véronique Barrault, 64, French actress (My True Love, My Wound, Lady Cops, Love and Fear), traffic collision.
Javier Barrero, 72, Spanish politician, deputy (1982–2016), cancer.
Jan Béghin, 72, Belgian politician, Flemish MP (1997–1999).
Tony Brooks, 90, British racing driver (Formula 1).
Lino Capolicchio, 78, Italian actor (The Garden of the Finzi-Continis, The House with Laughing Windows, The Bloodstained Shadow) and director.
Wink Davenport, 80, American Olympic volleyball player (1968).
Francesco D'Agostino, 76, Italian jurist.
Klaus Hirche, 82, German Olympic ice hockey player (1968).
George Horvath, 62, Swedish pentathlete, Olympic bronze medalist (1980).
Wilson Karunaratne, 79, Sri Lankan actor (One Shot, Vijaya Kuweni) and stunt director.
Valeri Kocharov, 74, Georgian rock guitarist and singer, stroke.
Julie Lutz, 77, American astronomer and mathematician.
Ted Luscombe, 97, British Anglican prelate, bishop of Brechin (1975–1990).
Andra Martin, 86, American actress (Up Periscope, The Thing That Couldn't Die, Yellowstone Kelly).
Norman Mineta, 90, American politician, member of the U.S. House of Representatives (1975–1995), secretary of commerce (2000–2001) and transportation (2001–2006), heart disease.
Meda Mládková, 102, Czech art collector.
Lahcen Sekkouri, 69–70, Moroccan politician, minister of youth and sports (2015–2016).
Tim Shaffer, 76, American politician, member of the Pennsylvania State Senate (1981–1996).
Stanislav Shushkevich, 87, Belarusian politician, chairman of the Supreme Council (1991–1994), complications from COVID-19.
Hiroyuki Watanabe, 66, Japanese actor (Shinjuku Outlaw, Kamen Rider Den-O: I'm Born!, Garo), suicide by hanging.
Bert Weaver, 90, American golfer.
Carrie White, 78, American hairdresser, cancer.
Mieke Wijaya, 83, Indonesian actress (Tiga Dara, Badai Pasti Berlalu, Verses of Love) and model.
Yu Zhigang, 48, Chinese politician.

4
Joaquin C. Arriola, 96, American attorney and politician.
Baek Nam-chi, 78, South Korean politician, MP (1988–2000).
Richard Connolly, 94, Australian composer and musician.
Anne de Leseleuc, 94, French writer, historian, and actress (Royal Affairs in Versailles, Charming Boys).
Nguyễn Duy Quý, 90, Vietnamese academic and politician, MP (1992–2002).
Mary Fuller, 99, American sculptor and art historian.
Herschella Horton, 83, American politician, member of the Arizona House of Representatives (1991–2001).
Albin Julius, 54, Austrian musician (Der Blutharsch).
Charoen Khanthawong, 89, Thai politician, MP (1975–2014).
Zbigniew Kicka, 72, Polish Olympic boxer (1976).
Józef Leśniak, 54, Polish politician, MP (2015–2019).
Gerhard Mans, 60, Namibian rugby union player (Free State Cheetahs, South West Africa, national team), traffic collision.
Donald McKellow, 96, British Olympic cyclist (1952).
Kenny Moore, 78, American Olympic runner (1968, 1972).
Harm Ottenbros, 78, Dutch racing cyclist, UCI Road World Champion (1969). 
Lalli Partinen, 80, Finnish Olympic ice hockey player (1968), COVID-19.
Howie Pyro, 61, American punk bassist (D Generation), COVID-19.
Odir Rocha, 81, Brazilian politician, deputy (1995) and mayor of Palmas (1997–2000).
Hélène de Saint-Père, 58, French actress (Hôtel de France, Peau d'Ange, Vendredi soir).
Juhani Salmenkylä, 90, Finnish Olympic basketball official (1964) and orienteering competitor, European relay champion (1964).
Lars Skåål, 72, Swedish Olympic water polo player (1980).
Géza Varasdi, 94, Hungarian athlete, Olympic bronze medallist (1952). (death announced on this date)
Wukun Wanambi, 59, Australian Yolngu painter.
Yuliya Voyevodina, 50, Russian Olympic racewalker (2004).

5
Sir James Anderton, 89, British police officer, chief constable of Greater Manchester Police (1976–1991).
Amanda Claridge, 72, British archaeologist, cancer.
Justin Constantine, 52, American military officer, prostate cancer.
Lamin Conteh, 45, Sierra Leonean footballer (Beerschot, Meppen, national team). 
Leonid Dukhovny, 83, Ukrainian-American singer-songwriter, fire.
Serhiy Dyachenko, 77, Ukrainian writer and screenwriter (Dark Planet).
Mike Hagerty, 67, American actor (The George Carlin Show, Lucky Louie, Friends), antibiotic reaction.
Du'Vonta Lampkin, 25, American football player (Massachusetts Pirates), shot.
José Manuel Liaño Flores, 100, Spanish lawyer and politician, member of Cortes Españolas (1967–1977) and mayor of A Coruña (1976–1979).
Mohammad Akbar Lone, 75, Indian politician, MP (since 2019) and Jammu and Kashmir MLA (2012–2018).
Ronald Lopatni, 77, Croatian water polo player, Olympic champion (1968).
Faye Marlowe, 95, American actress (Rendezvous with Annie, Hangover Square, Junior Miss).
Gary Miller, 62, English musician, producer, and songwriter.
Théodore Nzue Nguema, 48, Gabonese football player (Angers, national team) and manager (Estrellas del Futuro).
František Plass, 78, Czech football player (Viktoria Plzeň, Czechoslovakia national team) and manager (Chmel Blšany).
Regina Reyes Mandanas, 57, Filipino politician, member of the House of Representatives (2013–2016).
Mario Roy, 71, Canadian journalist (La Presse).
Kevin Samuels, 57, American internet personality.
Gunnar Sandborg, 94, Norwegian Olympic rower (1948).
Arthur Tonkin, 92, Australian politician, Western Australia MLA (1971–1987).
José Félix Villarreal, 75-76, Mexican chess player, shot.
José Luis Violeta, 81, Spanish footballer (Zaragoza, national team).
Kenneth Welsh, 80, Canadian actor (Twin Peaks, The Aviator, The Day After Tomorrow), cancer.
Leo Wilden, 85, German footballer (1. FC Köln, Bayer Leverkusen, West Germany national team).

6
Gabriel Garran, 95, French actor and director.
Seán Garvey, 69, Irish traditional singer.
Alan Gillis, 85, Irish farmers' leader and politician, MEP (1994–1999).
Kostas Gousgounis, 91, Greek pornographic actor, heart attack.
Helen Kleberg Groves, 94, American rancher.
Alf Hambe, 91, Swedish author, composer, and singer-songwriter.
George Huang, 86, Taiwanese politician, Changhua County magistrate (1981–1989) and chairman of the Central Election Commission (1994–1995, 1999–2004).
Jewell, 53, American R&B singer.
Bill Laskey, 79, American football player (Oakland Raiders, Baltimore Colts, Denver Broncos).
Patricia A. McKillip, 74, American author (The Forgotten Beasts of Eld, Harpist in the Wind, Ombria in Shadow).
Kelly Meafua, 31, Samoan rugby player (US Montauban), jumping from bridge.
Ann Metzinger, 90, American nutritionist.
Hajdar Muneka, 68, Albanian journalist and diplomat.
John Akparibo Ndebugre, 72, Ghanaian politician, MP (2005–2009).
George Pérez, 67, American comic book artist (The Avengers, Crisis on Infinite Earths, Teen Titans) and writer, pancreatic cancer.
Mirosław Pietrewicz, 81, Polish economist and politician, minister of state treasury and deputy prime minister (1996–1997), MP (1997–2001).
Claude Provencher, 72, Canadian architect.
Bojjala Gopala Krishna Reddy, 73, Indian politician, Andhra Pradesh MLA (1989–2004, since 2009), cardiac arrest.
George Seals, 79, American football player (Chicago Bears, Kansas City Chiefs, Washington Redskins).
Al Spalding, 89, American naval architect.
Mark Sweeney, 62, American politician, member of the Montana Senate (since 2021).
Marian van der Meer, 85, Dutch politician, senator (1983–1995).

7
Mike Adamson, 74, American baseball player (Baltimore Orioles).
Shah Jikrul Ahmad, 70, Bangladeshi politician, MP (2009–2014), heart attack.
Antón Arieta, 76, Spanish footballer (Athletic Bilbao, Hércules, national team).
Yuri Averbakh, 100, Russian chess grandmaster and author.
Ihor Bedzai, 49, Ukrainian naval officer and pilot, shot down.
Jürgen Blin, 79, German boxer, European heavyweight champion (1972).
Elisa Maria Damião, 75, Portuguese politician and trade union activist, MP (1987–1998), MEP (1998–2004).
Fisseha Desta, 81, Ethiopian military officer and politician, vice president (1987–1991), heart disease.
Suzi Gablik, 87, American artist, author and art critic.
Mickey Gilley, 86, American country singer ("Room Full of Roses", "Don't the Girls All Get Prettier at Closing Time", "Stand by Me").
Partha Ghosh, 81, Indian reciter.
Marek Grabowski, 72, Polish doctor and politician.
Kang Soo-yeon, 55, South Korean actress (The Surrogate Woman, Come Come Come Upward, All That Falls Has Wings), complications from cerebral hemorrhage.
Jack Kehler, 75, American actor (The Big Lebowski, Men in Black II, Fever Pitch), complications from leukemia.
Bruce MacVittie, 65, American actor (Million Dollar Baby, The Sopranos, American Buffalo).
Jack McDonald, 92, Australian footballer (St Kilda).
Francis J. Meehan, 98, American diplomat, United States ambassador to Czechoslovakia (1979–1980), Poland (1980–1983) and East Germany (1985–1988).
Sir Paul Mellars, 82, British archaeologist.
Simion Mironaș, 56, Romanian footballer (CSM Suceava, Gloria Bistrița, Olimpia Satu Mare).
Dominique Mortemousque, 71, French politician, senator (2002–2008).
Adel Al Mulla, 51, Qatari footballer (1992 Olympic team, national team), heart attack.
Kwaku Ohene-Frempong, 76, Ghanaian physician, lung cancer.
Elvin Papik, 95, American college football coach (Doane University) and administrator.
Robin Parkinson, 92, English actor ('Allo 'Allo!, Button Moon, Twisted Nerve).
Maria Radnoti-Alföldi, 95, Hungarian-German archaeologist and numismatist.
Amadou Soumahoro, 68, Ivorian politician, president of the National Assembly (since 2019).

8
André Arthur, 78, Canadian radio host and politician, MP (2006–2011).
Paul Bladt, 90, French trade unionist and politician, deputy (1981–1986).
Karl Bruggmann, 86, Swiss Olympic wrestler (1960).
John R. Cherry III, 73, American film director and screenwriter (Ernest Saves Christmas, Ernest Scared Stupid, Ernest Goes to Jail), complications from Parkinson's disease.
Harry Dornbrand, 99, American aerospace engineer.
Syd Farrimond, 81, English footballer (Bolton Wanderers, Tranmere Rovers, Halifax Town), complications from dementia.
Michel Gervais, 77, Canadian university professor, rector of Université Laval (1987–1997).
Robert Gillmor, 85, British wildlife artist and illustrator.
Maria Gusakova, 91, Russian cross-country skier, Olympic champion (1960).
Hidenori Hasegawa, 84, Japanese politician, member of the Tokyo Metropolitan Assembly (1989–1993).
Bengt Johansson, 79, Swedish handball player and coach.
Rajat Kumar Kar, 87, Indian playwright, non-fiction author and broadcaster, heart disease.
Kim Chi-ha, 81, South Korean poet and playwright.
Sunny Low, 82, Singaporean ballroom dancer and choreographer, brain haemorrhage.
Arthur Nzeribe, 83, Nigerian politician, senator (1999–2007).
Nigel F. Palmer, 75, British Germanist.
Stefanos Petrakis, 97, Greek Olympic sprinter (1948, 1952).
Mahendra Raj, 97, Indian engineer (Pragati Maidan, Indian Institute of Management Bangalore, Salar Jung Museum).
Sunil Kanti Roy, 78, Indian businessman (Peerless Group).
Antonio Salazar, 33, Mexican footballer (Guadalajara, Chiapas, Santos de Guápiles), burned.
Ray Scott, 88, American angler, founder of the Bass Anglers Sportsman Society.
Robert J. Vlasic, 96, American executive (Vlasic Pickles, Henry Ford Hospital).
Fred Ward, 79, American actor (Escape from Alcatraz, The Right Stuff, Tremors).
Dennis Waterman, 74, English actor (Minder, The Sweeney, New Tricks) and singer, lung cancer.
Zhuang Qiaosheng, 105, Chinese geneticist and wheat breeder, member of the Chinese Academy of Sciences.

9
Amarakeerthi Athukorala, 57, Sri Lankan politician, MP (since 2020), beaten.
Bob Barnard, 88, Australian jazz trumpeter.
Robert Brom, 83, American Roman Catholic prelate, bishop of Duluth (1983–1989) and San Diego (1990–2013).
John L. Canley, 84, American soldier, Medal of Honor recipient, cancer.
Fred Carter, 83, American comic book artist (Chick Publications).
John H. Coates, 77, Australian mathematician.
Paolo Dalle Fratte, 70, Italian politician, deputy (2001–2006).
Midge Decter, 94, American non-fiction writer.
Denys Dubrov, 33, Ukrainian swimmer, four-time Paralympic champion (2016, 2020).
Tadeusz Grygiel, 68, Polish basketball player (Śląsk Wrocław).
Gerald Hannon, 77, Canadian journalist (The Body Politic).
Olawale Adeniji Ige, 83, Nigerian electrical engineer, minister of communications (1990–1992) and aviation (1993).
Tim Johnson, 75, American politician, member of the U.S. House of Representatives (2001–2013) and the Illinois House of Representatives (1977–2001).
Rieko Kodama, 58, Japanese video game designer (Phantasy Star, 7th Dragon, Skies of Arcadia).
Linda Lê, 58, French writer.
John Leo, 86, American journalist (The New York Times).
Jody Lukoki, 29, Dutch-Congolese footballer (Ajax, PFC Ludogorets Razgrad, DR Congolese national team), complications from injuries sustained in a beating.
Andreas Lütkefels, 57, German Olympic rower (1988).
David Lytton-Cobbold, 2nd Baron Cobbold, 84, British hereditary peer, member of the House of Lords (2000–2014), complications from Parkinson's disease.
Minoru Nojima, 76, Japanese classical pianist.
Adreian Payne, 31, American basketball player (Atlanta Hawks, Minnesota Timberwolves, Juventas Utina), shot.
Qin Yi, 100, Chinese actress (Far Away Love, Woman Basketball Player No. 5, Troubled Laughter).
Inge Viett, 78, German militant (2 June Movement, Red Army Faction) and writer.
Lily Chodidjah Wahid, 74, Indonesian politician, MP (2009–2013).
Davyd Zhvania, 54, Ukrainian politician, minister of emergency (2005) and deputy (2002–2014), shelling.

10
Manuel Abreu, 63, French-Portuguese football player (Reims, Nancy) and manager (Calais).
Jim Andreotti, 84, American football player (Toronto Argonauts, Montreal Alouettes).
James A. Beckford, 79, British sociologist.
Richard Benson, 67, British-Italian guitarist, singer and television host.
Bob Blizzard, 71, British politician, MP (1997–2010), lord commissioner of the Treasury (2008–2010).
Hanns-Peter Boehm, 94, German chemist.
Doug Caldwell, 94, New Zealand jazz musician.
Yung-Ping Chen, 91, Chinese-born American economist and gerontologist.
John Cripps, 95, British-Australian horticulturalist (Cripps Pink).
Mike Davis, 80, English rugby union player (Sherborne, national team) and coach.
María Duval, 95, Argentine actress (Historia de una mala mujer).
Nessim Gaon, 100, Sudanese-Swiss financier.
Walter Hirsch, 92, American basketball player (Kentucky Wildcats).
Leonid Kravchuk, 88, Ukrainian politician, president (1991–1994), two-time people's deputy, and chairman of the Verkhovna Rada (1991).
Bob Lanier, 73, American Hall of Fame basketball player (Detroit Pistons, Milwaukee Bucks) and coach (Golden State Warriors).
Kjell Lönnå, 85, Swedish conductor, composer and television host.
Jesús Mariñas, 79, Spanish journalist, bladder cancer.
Enrique Metinides, 88, Mexican crime photographer.
Jock O'Brien, 84, Australian footballer (North Melbourne, Ulverstone, Central District).
Marcelo Pecci, 45, Paraguayan prosecutor, shot.
Katsumoto Saotome, 90, Japanese author.
Shivkumar Sharma, 84, Indian santoor player (Shiv–Hari) and composer (Chandni, Lamhe), cardiac arrest.
Glyn Shaw, 71, Welsh rugby union (national team) and rugby league (Widnes, Wigan) player.
Gideon Tinsley, 95, American politician, member of the Oklahoma Senate (1975–1983).
Karl Van Roy, 83, American politician, member of the Wisconsin State Assembly (2003–2013).
Richard Worth, 73, New Zealand politician, MP (1999–2009), minister of internal affairs (2008–2009).
Peter Wu Junwei, 58, Chinese Roman Catholic prelate, prefect apostolic of Xinjiang (since 2010), heart attack.

11
Shireen Abu Akleh, 51, Palestinian-American journalist (Al Jazeera), shot.
Edward Arnett, 99, American chemist.
Jim Asato, 94, American college football and baseball coach (Hawaii Rainbow Warrior).
Peter Atkins, 86, British-born New Zealand Anglican priest, Bishop of Waiapu (1983–1990).
Sam Basil, 52, Papua New Guinean politician, deputy prime minister (since 2020), MP (since 2007), and minister of finance (2019), traffic collision.
William Bennett, 86, British flautist.
Jeroen Brouwers, 82, Dutch writer.
Patricia Cahill, 77, Irish singer.
Clarence Dixon, 66, American murderer, execution by lethal injection.
Norman Dolph, 83, American songwriter ("Life Is a Rock (But the Radio Rolled Me)") and record producer, cancer.
Marilyn Fogel, 69, American geo-ecologist.
Paul Ginsborg, 76, British historian.
Barbara Gloudon, 87, Jamaican journalist, author and playwright.
Henk Groot, 84, Dutch footballer (Ajax Amsterdam, Feyenoord, national team).
Ian Hall, 82, Guyanese-born British musician, composer and educator.
Margot Heuman, 94, German-born American Holocaust survivor.
Philip L. Kohl, 75, American anthropologist.
Harerangi Meihana, 88, New Zealand church leader, president of the Rātana Church (since 1999).
Claude Peter, 74, French basketball player (Le Mans Sarthe Basket, national team).
June Preston, 93, American actress (Anne of Green Gables, Christmas in July), dementia.
Sukh Ram, 94, Indian politician, minister of communications (1993–1996) and MP (1984–1998), stroke.
Alexander Toradze, 69, Georgian pianist.
Ryuhei Ueshima, 61, Japanese comedian and actor, suicide by hanging.
Randy Weaver, 74, American survivalist (Ruby Ridge).

12
Haleh Afshar, Baroness Afshar, 77, British academic and politician, member of the House of Lords (since 2007).
Juan Amat, 75, Spanish field hockey player, Olympic silver medalist (1980).
Ruth Bishop, 89, Australian virologist.
Gino Cappelletti, 88, American football player (Boston Patriots) and analyst.
Bernard Carton, 74, French politician, deputy (1988–1993), complications from Alzheimer's disease.
Luis Albeiro Cortés Rendón, 70, Colombian Roman Catholic prelate, bishop of Vélez (2003–2015) and auxiliary bishop of Pereira (since 2015).
Kieran Egan, 79, Irish educational philosopher and author (The Educated Mind, Getting It Wrong from the Beginning, An Imaginative Approach to Teaching).
Djalu Gurruwiwi, 86–87, Australian yidaki player.
Larry Holley, 76, American college basketball coach (William Jewell Cardinals, Central Methodist Eagles, Northwest Missouri State Bearcats).
Ramesh Latke, 52, Indian politician, Maharashtra MLA (since 2014), heart attack.
Paul Makler Sr., 101, American Olympic fencer (1952).
Daniel Joseph Marion, 76, Canadian politician, commissioner of the Northwest Territories (1999–2000).
Robert McFarlane, 84, American Marine Corps officer and politician, national security advisor (1983–1985), complications from lung disease.
Henry Mollicone, 76, American composer.
Brian Muggleton, 80, Australian cricketer (Western Australia).
Rainer Nägele, 78, Liechtenstein-born American literary scholar.
Francesco Nucara, 82, Italian politician, deputy (1983–1994, 2006–2013).
Maria Pańczyk-Pozdziej, 80, Polish politician, senator (2005–2019).
Giorgio Pasetto, 80, Italian politician, deputy (1996–2006), senator (2006–2008).
Béla Petsco, 79, American writer (Nothing Very Important and Other Stories).
Vagish Shastri, 86, Indian grammarian and linguist.
Alexei Tsvetkov, 75, Russian poet.
Arnold Walker, 70, English rugby league player (Whitehaven, Workington Town, Cumbria), cancer.
Arthuryne J. Welch-Taylor, 105, American educator.

13
Julie Beckett, 72, American teacher and disability rights activist, heart attack.
Teresa Berganza, 89, Spanish mezzo-soprano.
Bob Ciaffone, 81, American poker player.
Karim Djoudi, 63, Algerian politician, minister of finance (2007–2014).
Jean Faure, 85, French politician, senator (1983–2011).
Maurice Fisher, 91, American baseball player (Cincinnati Redlegs).
Ricky Gardiner, 73, Scottish guitarist (Beggars Opera) and composer.
Sir Angus Grossart, 85, Scottish merchant banker and newspaper executive (Daily Record, Sunday Mail).
Katsuhiko Kumazaki, 80, Japanese baseball administrator, commissioner of Nippon Professional Baseball (2014–2017), heart failure.
Lil Keed, 24, American rapper ("Nameless"), liver and kidney failure.
Jim Lyall, 76–77, Canadian politician, president of Nunatsiavut (2008–2012).
Henry G. Martin, 70, English filmmaker.
Alec Mathieson, 101, Australian football player (Geelong).
Ben Roy Mottelson, 95, American-Danish nuclear physicist, Nobel Prize laureate (1975).
*Khalifa bin Zayed Al Nahyan, 73, Emirati royal and politician, president (since 2004) and ruler of Abu Dhabi (since 2004).
Simon Preston, 83, English organist, conductor, and composer.
João Rendeiro, 69, Portuguese banker, founder of Banco Privado Português, suicide by hanging.
Ed Rynders, 62, American politician, member of the Georgia House of Representatives (2003–2019).
Viktor Samokhin, 66, Russian football player (Spartak Moscow, CSKA, Soviet Union national team) and coach.
Uri Savir, 69, Israeli politician, MK (1999–2001) and diplomat.
Rosmarie Trapp, 93, Austrian-born American singer (Trapp Family).
Richard Wald, 92, American television executive (NBC News, ABC News) and journalist (New York Herald Tribune), complications from a stroke.
Yang Hyong-sop, 96, North Korean politician, chairman of the Supreme People's Assembly (1983–1998), stroke.

14
América Alonso, 85, Venezuelan actress.
Andrei Babushkin, 58, Russian human rights activist, politician and publicist, pancreatitis.
Bernard Bigot, 72, French physicist and civil servant, director general of ITER (since 2015).
François Blais, 49, Canadian writer (Lac Adélard).
Piero Carletto, 59, Italian Olympic rower (1988), cancer.
Donal Courtney, 52, Irish actor, playwright and stage director.
James Francis Edwards, 100, Canadian fighter pilot.
Ramez Elmasri, 71, Egyptian-American computer scientist.
Helen Fein, 87–88, American sociologist.
Christian Giudicelli, 79, French novelist and literary critic.
Peter Nicholas, 80, American businessman, co-founder of Boston Scientific, cancer.
Jagadamba Prasad Nigam, 94, Indian politician.
Valerio Onida, 86, Italian jurist, judge (1996–2005) and president (2004–2005) of the Constitutional Court.
Serhii Parkhomenko, 25, Ukrainian military serviceman.
Maxi Rolón, 27, Argentine footballer (FC Barcelona B, Coquimbo Unido, Fuerza Amarilla), traffic collision.
Donald Kemp Ross, 78, American public interest lawyer and author.
Arthur Shurlock, 84, American Olympic gymnast (1964).
Breno Silveira, 58, Brazilian film director (Two Sons of Francisco, Once Upon a Time in Rio).
Andrew Symonds, 46, Australian cricketer (Queensland, Kent, national team), traffic collision.
Urvashi Vaid, 63, Indian-American LGBT activist and author (Virtual Equality).
David West, 57, American baseball player (Minnesota Twins, Philadelphia Phillies, New York Mets), brain cancer.
Francesco Zerrillo, 91, Italian Roman Catholic prelate, bishop of Tricarico (1985–1997) and of Lucera-Troia (1997–2007).

15
Rainer Basedow, 83, German actor (My Daughter, Your Daughter, Three Men in the Snow, Lina Braake).
Sir Shane Blewitt, 87, British courtier and military officer.
Robert Cogoi, 82, Belgian singer.
Frank Curry, 72, Australian rugby league player and coach (South Sydney).
Pallavi Dey, 25, Indian actress (Kunjochaya, Saraswatir Prem).
Jim Ferlo, 70, American politician, member of the Pennsylvania Senate (2003–2015).
Deborah Fraser, 56, South African gospel singer, stroke.
Hossein Ghafourizadeh, 78, Iranian Olympic sprinter (1964).
Go Gwi-nam, 88, South Korean politician, member of the National Assembly (1972–1988).
Ignacy Gogolewski, 90, Polish actor (Three Stories, Tonight a City Will Die, The Codes).
George Graham, 73, American politician, member of the North Carolina House of Representatives (2013–2019).
Klara Höfels, 73, German actress (Toni Erdmann, Cut Off).
Tadeusz Kowalczyk, 89, Polish politician and Rural Solidarity activist, MP (1989–1993).
Knox Martin, 99, Colombian-born American painter and sculptor.
Kay Mellor, 71, British actress and writer (Children's Ward, Families, Fat Friends).
David Milgaard, 69, Canadian prisoners' rights advocate, wrongfully convicted of rape and murder, complications from pneumonia.
Salah Montaser, 88, Egyptian writer and journalist.
Ken Mulhall, 94, Australian footballer (St Kilda Football Club).
Martin Munyanyi, 66, Zimbabwean Roman Catholic prelate, bishop of Gweru (2006–2012).
John Mutton, 74, British politician, member of Coventry City Council (since 1984).
Stevan Ostojić, 80, Serbian footballer (Red Star Belgrade, Yugoslavia national team).
Maggie Peterson, 81, American actress (The Andy Griffith Show, The Bill Dana Show) and location manager (Casino).
Dhu al-Himma Shalish, 71, Syrian military officer.
Sean Shanahan, 71, Canadian ice hockey player (Montreal Canadiens, Colorado Rockies, Boston Bruins).
Eugene Saloom, 87, American politician, three-time member of the Pennsylvania House of Representatives.
Yoshie Takahashi, 90, Japanese Olympic long jumper (1956) and sports administrator, stroke.
Jerzy Trela, 80, Polish actor (Man of Iron, Danton, The Mother of Kings).
Șerban Valeca, 65, Romanian engineer and politician, deputy (2000) and senator (2008–2020).

16
Josef Abrhám, 82, Czech actor (Transport from Paradise, Courage for Every Day, Morgiana).
John Aylward, 75, American actor (ER, The West Wing, The Way Back).
Iann Barron, 85, British computer programmer and entrepreneur.
William N. Dunn, 83, American international relations scholar.
Seyyed Abdollah Fateminia, 76, Iranian Islamic cleric.
Feng Jianshen, 69, Chinese politician, CPPCC chairman of Gansu (2011–2018).
Lothar Gaa, 91, German politician, member of the Landtag of Baden-Württemberg (1968–1984).
Hilarion, 74, Canadian-born American Russian Orthodox prelate, first hierarch of the ROCOR (since 2008).
Algis Ignatavicius, 89, Lithuanian-born Australian Olympic basketball player (1956).
Sidney Kramer, 96, American politician, member of the Maryland Senate (1978–1986).
Klaus-Michael Körner, 69, German politician, member of the Landtag of Mecklenburg-Vorpommern (1998–2011).
David MacMichael, 95, American whistleblower.
Faouzi Mansouri, 66, Algerian footballer (Nîmes, Mulhouse, national team).
Albin Molnár, 86, Hungarian Olympic sailor (1960).
Kjellaug Nakkim, 81, Norwegian politician, MP (1989–2001).
Ademola Okulaja, 46, Nigerian-born German basketball player (Alba Berlin, FC Barcelona, Brose Baskets).
Carol Ann Peters, 89, American figure skater and ice dancer.
Epaminondas Stassinopoulos, 101, German-born American astrophysicist, writer, and World War II resistance member (EKKA).

17
Muhammad Baydoun, 70, Lebanese politician, MP (1992–2005).
Robert Bertrand, 69, Canadian politician, MP (1993–2004).
E. Gerald Corrigan, 80, American banker, president of the Federal Reserve Bank of New York (1985–1993), complications from Alzheimer's disease.
Kristine Gebbie, 78, American academic and public health official, White House AIDS policy coordinator (1993–1994).
Jeong Rae-hyuk, 96, South Korean military officer and politician, defense minister (1970–1971), MP (1973–1985).
Marvin Josephson, 95, American talent manager, founder of ICM Partners.
Rolands Kalniņš, 100, Latvian film director (I Remember Everything, Richard, Four White Shirts), screenwriter, and producer.
Johan Kleppe, 93, Norwegian politician, MP (1969–1973) and minister of defence (1972–1973).
Maurice Lindsay, 81, British sports administrator (Preston North End, Wigan Warriors).
Eliseo Mendoza Berrueto, 91, Mexican politician, president of the Chamber of Deputies (1985) and governor of Coahuila (1987–1993).
Antonio Oviedo, 83, Spanish football player (Mallorca, Elche) and manager (Atlético Baleares).
Rick Price, 77, English bassist (The Move, Wizzard).
Mohamed Rabbae, 81, Moroccan-born Dutch politician and activist, MP (1994–2002).
Rodri, 88, Spanish footballer (Condal, Barcelona, national team).
Marnie Schulenburg, 37, American actress (As the World Turns, One Life to Live, Tainted Dreams), breast cancer.
Thomas Smith, 90, American Olympic sport shooter (1964).
Vangelis, 79, Greek musician (Aphrodite's Child) and film composer (Chariots of Fire, Blade Runner), Oscar winner (1982), heart failure.

18
Alexander Astin, 89, American educator and writer.
Miguel Báez Espuny, 91, Spanish bullfighter and actor (Litri and His Shadow).
Brian Bedford, 88, Welsh footballer (AFC Bournemouth, Queens Park Rangers, Scunthorpe United).
Cathal Coughlan, 61, Irish singer-songwriter (Microdisney, The Fatima Mansions).
Fernando Guimarães Kevanu, 85, Angolan Roman Catholic prelate, bishop of Ondjiva (1988–2011).
Anne Howells, 81, British operatic mezzo-soprano, myeloma.
Werner Israel, 90, German-born South African-Canadian physicist.
Jim Kelly, 80, American football player (Pittsburgh Steelers, Philadelphia Eagles).
Larry Lacewell, 85, American football player (Arkansas–Monticello Boll Weevils), coach (Arkansas State Indians) and scouting director (Dallas Cowboys).
A. C. M. Lafir, 86, Sri Lankan cricketer (Ceylon).
Linda Lawson, 86, American actress (Sometimes a Great Notion, Night Tide, Adventures in Paradise).
Peter Maitlis, 89, British chemist.
Henry Mavrodin, 84, Romanian painter, designer and essayist.
Mpho Moerane, 52, South African restaurateur and politician, mayor of Johannesburg (2021), traffic collision.
Bob Neuwirth, 82, American singer-songwriter ("Mercedes Benz").
Raoul Pleskow, 91, Austrian-born American composer.
Paul Plimley, 69, Canadian free jazz pianist and vibraphonist, cancer.
Thomas Resetarits, 82, Austrian sculptor.
Alf Saltveit, 75, Norwegian poet and novelist.
Sam Smith, 78, American basketball player (Kentucky Colonels).
Martin Šustr, 31, Czech footballer (Zbrojovka Brno, Vítkovice, Líšeň), traffic collision.
Domingo Villar, 51, Spanish writer (Death on a Galician Shore), complications from a stroke.

19
Sheherezade Alam, 74, Pakistani ceramist.
Abdul Gaffar Chowdhury, 87, Bangladeshi-born British journalist and songwriter ("Ekusher Gaan").
Jean-Louis Comolli, 80, French film critic (Cahiers du Cinéma) and director.
Aseff Ahmad Daula, 81, Pakistani politician, minister of foreign affairs (1993–1996) and education (2008–2010).
Joseph F. Hoffman, 97, American scientist and academic.
Mavis Hutchison, 97, South African athlete.
Hyon Chol-hae, 87, North Korean military officer, vice director of the GPB (1986–1995), multiple organ failure.
William Lancaster, 84, British social anthropologist.
Chete Lera, 72, Spanish actor (The Red Squirrel, Secrets of the Heart, Open Your Eyes), traffic collision.
Stan Openshaw, 75, British geographer.
Pamela Sharples, Baroness Sharples, 99, British life peer, member of the House of Lords (1973–2017).
George Shepherd, 84, Canadian Olympic hurdler (1960).
Michael Sze, 76, Hong Kong civil servant, secretary for constitutional affairs (1991–1994) and executive director of the Trade Development Council (1996–2004).
Bernard Wright, 58, American funk and jazz singer ("Who Do You Love"), traffic collision.

20
Muthaffar al-Nawab, 88, Iraqi poet and political critic.
Roger Angell, 101, American sportswriter and author (Season Ticket: A Baseball Companion), heart failure.
Glenys Arthur, 86, New Zealand neurologist.
Ahmed Benaissa, 78, Algerian actor (Barakat!, Rome Rather Than You, The Colonel).
Sir Colin Campbell, 77, British lawyer, vice-chancellor of the University of Nottingham (1988–2008).
Griselda El Tayib, 97, British-born Sudanese writer and cultural anthropologist.
Jeffrey Escoffier, 79, American author and activist.
Sir Edward Evans-Lombe, 85, British judge.
Tony Fitzjohn, 76, British conservationist, cancer.
Glenn Hackney, 97, American politician, member of the Alaska House of Representatives (1973–1977) and Senate (1977–1981), traffic collision.
Yuri Javadyan, 87, Armenian politician.
Caroline Jones, 84, Australian broadcaster (This Day Tonight, Four Corners, Australian Story), fall.
Eugenio López Rodea, 87, Mexican business executive, founder of Jumex.
Calvin Magee, 59, American football player (Tampa Bay Buccaneers) and coach (Arizona Wildcats, West Virginia Mountaineers), complications from a heart attack.
Vladimir Nenadić, 51, Serbian footballer (Bečej, Vojvodina, 1. FC Tatran).
Camille Ninel, 94, French footballer (Olympique Lyonnais, Moulins).
Hillar Palamets, 94, Estonian historian.
Betty Reed, 81, American politician, member of the Florida House of Representatives (2006–2014).
Dame Aroha Reriti-Crofts, 83, New Zealand community activist, president of the Māori Women's Welfare League (1990–1993).
Susan Roces, 80, Filipino actress (Ang Daigdig Ko'y Ikaw, Patayin Mo Sa Sindak Si Barbara, Ang Probinsyano), cardiopulmonary arrest.
Domina Eberle Spencer, 101, American mathematician. (death announced on this date)
Bruce Tabb, 95, American-born New Zealand accountancy academic.
Corky Taylor, 88, American football player (Los Angeles Rams).
Kirill Teiter, 69, Estonian politician, MP (1992–1995).

21
John Brillhart, 91, American mathematician.
Colin Cantwell, 90, American film concept artist (2001: A Space Odyssey, Star Wars, WarGames).
Marco Cornez, 64, Chilean footballer (Club Deportivo Palestino, Antofagasta, national team), stomach cancer.
Hubert Fermina, 74, Dutch politician, member of the House of Representatives (1994–1998).
David Forbes, 88, Australian sailor, Olympic champion (1972).
Fon Angwafo III of Mankon, 97, Cameroonian traditional ruler, MP (1962–1988).
Jane Haist, 73, Canadian Olympic discus thrower (1976).
Heddy Honigmann, 70, Peruvian-born Dutch film director (O Amor Natural, Crazy, Goodbye).
Peter Koper, 75, American journalist, screenwriter (Headless Body in Topless Bar, Island of the Dead) and producer.
Rosemary Radford Ruether, 85, American feminist theologian.
Tota Singh, 81, Indian politician, Punjab MLA (1997–2007, 2012–2017), complications from pneumonia.
Tania Tinoco, 58, Ecuadorian journalist, author, and television producer.
Emil Aloysius Wcela, 91, American Roman Catholic prelate, auxiliary bishop of Rockville Centre (1988–2007).
Gordie Windhorn, 88, American baseball player (New York Yankees).
Yam Bing-yee, 90, Hong Kong Cantonese opera singer and actress.
Achmad Yurianto, 60, Indonesian military doctor and bureaucrat.
Jiří Zídek Sr., 78, Czech Hall of Fame Olympic basketball player (1972) and coach.
Nikolai Zouev, 64, Russian mixed martial artist, heart disease.

22
Kanamat Botashev, 63, Russian major general.
Harold Brookfield, 96, British-Australian geographer.
John Burton, 78, British conservationist and author.
John Clarke, 87, Canadian Olympic sailor (1972).
Don Collins, 69, American baseball player (Atlanta Braves, Cleveland Indians).
József Duró, 55, Hungarian football player (Debreceni VSC, national team) and manager (Vecsési).
Les Dyl, 69, English rugby league player (Leeds Rhinos, Bramley, national team).
Colin Forbes, 94, British graphic designer.
Joe Hawke, 82, New Zealand Māori activist and politician, MP (1996–2002).
Hazel Henderson, 89, British-American futurist and economist.
Eduard Hercigonja, 92, Croatian philologist, Croatist and literary historian.
Julian Hochberg, 98, American psychology researcher.
Takashi Ishii, 75, Japanese film director (Original Sin, Freeze Me, Gonin Saga) and manga artist, cancer.
Duberildo Jaque, 101, Chilean lawyer and politician, deputy (1961–1973).
Greg Jein, 76, American visual effects artist (Close Encounters of the Third Kind, Avatar, Star Trek).
Mohammad Ebrahim Khedri, 84, Afghan four-time Olympic wrestler.
Andrew Krystal, 62, Canadian news anchor and radio host.
Lee Lawson, 80, American actress (Guiding Light, One Life to Live, Love of Life), cancer and COVID-19.
Rodrigo Lozano de la Fuente, 101, Spanish politician, senator (1977–1979).
John M. Merriman, 75, American historian.
Miss.Tic, 66, French street artist.
Dervla Murphy, 90, Irish travel writer (Full Tilt: Ireland to India with a Bicycle) and cyclist.
Andréi Nakov, 80, French-Bulgarian art historian.
Oemarsono, 82, Indonesian civil servant and politician, governor of Lampung (1998–2003).
Bonar Sianturi, 77, Indonesian military officer.
Jaakko Syrjä, 96, Finnish writer, COVID-19.
Minute Alapati Taupo, 60, Tuvaluan politician, deputy prime minister (since 2019), ambassador to Taiwan (2013–2017).
Peter Lamborn Wilson, 76–77, American anarchist author and poet (Temporary Autonomous Zone).

23
Jamie Bartlett, 55, English-born South African actor (American Ninja 2: The Confrontation, Ernest Goes to Africa, Mandela: Long Walk to Freedom), cardiac arrest.
Thom Bresh, 74, American country guitarist and singer, esophageal cancer.
Élie Buzyn, 93, Polish-born French surgeon and Holocaust survivor.
Don G. Despain, 81, American botanist and plant ecologist.
Francesco Ferrari, 75, Italian politician, MP (1992–2001) and MEP (2007–2009).
Anita Gradin, 88, Swedish politician, MP (1969–1992) and member of the European Commission (1995–1999).
Swarna Kahawita, 75, Sri Lankan film actress (Binaramalee).
Maja Lidia Kossakowska, 50, Polish fantasy writer, house fire.
Kathleen Lavoie, 72, American microbiologist and explorer.
Sergei Loginov, 58, Russian football player (Dinamo Leningrad).
Sivaji Patnaik, 91, Indian politician, MP (1977–1980, 1989–1996).
Joe Pignatano, 92, American baseball player (Los Angeles Dodgers, Kansas City Athletics) and coach (New York Mets), World Series champion (1959, 1969), complications from dementia.
Horst Sachtleben, 91, German actor (Beyond Silence, About a Girl).
Ilkka Suominen, 83, Finnish politician, speaker of the Parliament (1987, 1991–1993) and president of the Nordic Council (1992). 
Benedicta Ward, 89, British Anglican nun, theologian and historian.
Wendell, 74, Brazilian football player (Santa Cruz, Botafogo, national team) and manager.
Zaw Htay, 48, Burmese politician, spokesman of the President Office (2011–2016), heart attack.

24
Fred Aftalion, 100, French chemical engineer.
Vladimir Averchev, 75, Russian politician, deputy (1993–2000).
Don Edward Beck, 85, American psychologist (Spiral Dynamics).
Luis Calderón, 92, Peruvian footballer (Club Carlos Concha, Sport Boys, national team).
Gennaro Cannavacciuolo, 60, Italian actor (Un'estate al mare, La vita è una cosa meravigliosa), singer and comedian.
David Datuna, 48, Georgian-born American artist, lung cancer.
Alfred Grishin, 81, Russian boxing coach.
Hamid Yusif Hummadi, 87, Iraqi politician, minister of culture and information (1991–1996).
Tadeusz Jankowski, 92, Polish Olympic cross-country skier (1964).
Sajjad Kishwar, 88, Pakistani actor (Zanjeer, Khoon Aur Paani, Janbaaz).
Ouka Leele, 64, Spanish photographer, cancer.
Bob Miller, 86, American baseball player (Detroit Tigers, Cincinnati Reds, New York Mets).
Martha Myers, 97, American dance educator.
Salvador Rolando Ramos, 18, American mass shooter, (Robb Elementary School shooting), shot.
Khyongla Rato, 98–99, Tibetan Buddhist scholar, founder of The Tibet Center.
Maurizio Silvi, 75, Italian makeup artist (Moulin Rouge!, Gangs of New York, The Great Gatsby).
Derek Stokes, 82, English footballer (Huddersfield Town, Bradford City, Dundalk).
John Thompson, 95, American football executive (Minnesota Vikings, Seattle Seahawks).
Thomas Ulsrud, 50, Norwegian curler, Olympic silver medalist (2010), cancer.

25
Toby Berger, 81, American information theorist.
Jean-Louis Chautemps, 90, French jazz saxophonist.
Paul Cloke, 69, New Zealand geographer.
Dick Conway, 87, New Zealand rugby union player (Otago, Bay of Plenty, national team).
Wies van Dongen, 90, Dutch racing cyclist.
Allie Eagle, 73, New Zealand artist.
Luis Guillermo Eichhorn, 79, Argentine Roman Catholic prelate, bishop of Gualeguaychú (1996–2004) and Morón (2004–2017), cardiac arrest.
Lívia Gyarmathy, 90, Hungarian film director and screenwriter.
Morton L. Janklow, 91, American literary agent, heart failure.
Jack Kaiser, 95, American athletics coach (Oneonta Red Sox, Roanoke Red Sox) and administrator (St. John's Red Storm).
Eduardo Lizalde, 92, Mexican poet.
Thomas Murphy, 96, American broadcasting executive.
Gary Nelson, 87, American film and television director (Freaky Friday, The Black Hole, Washington: Behind Closed Doors).
Pinchas Stolper, 91, American Orthodox rabbi.

26
José Antolín Toledano, 86, Spanish industrialist.
Aldiglade Bhamu, 34, Zimbabwean footballer (national team).
Sir Arnold Burgen, 100, British physician, pharmacologist and academic.
Ciriaco De Mita, 94, Italian politician, prime minister (1988–1989), two-time deputy, and minister of industry (1973–1974), complications from a fall.
John Dodson, 3rd Baron Monk Bretton, 97, British hereditary peer, member of the House of Lords (1948–1999).
Andy Fletcher, 60, English Hall of Fame keyboardist (Depeche Mode), aortic dissection.
Willibrord Frequin, 80, Dutch journalist and television presenter, complications from Parkinson's disease.
Richard D. Johnson, 87, American accountant, Iowa state auditor (1979–2003).
Ann Johnston, 86, Canadian Olympic figure skater (1956).
Ray Liotta, 67, American actor (Goodfellas, Something Wild, Field of Dreams), Emmy winner (2005).
Drew McDermott, 72, American computer scientist.
Kay McFarland, 84, American football player (San Francisco 49ers), complications from Parkinson's disease.
Claude Michelet, 83, French writer.
Yuri Morozov, 84, Russian ice hockey player (Khimik Moscow Oblast) and coach.
Neil O'Donnell, 72, Scottish footballer (Norwich City, Sheffield Wednesday). (death announced on this date)
Elizabeth Raspolic, 82–83, American diplomat, ambassador to Gabon and São Tomé and Príncipe (1995–1998).
Phillip Ritzenberg, 90, American journalist (New York Daily News, The Jewish Week), cancer.
Johannes W. Rohen, 100, German anatomist.
Sergei Romanovtsev, 96, Russian military and intelligence officer.
George Shapiro, 91, American talent manager (Carl Reiner, Andy Kaufman) and television producer (Seinfeld).
Shin Il-ryong, 73, South Korean actor (Ghosts of Chosun, Long Live the Island Frogs).
Enyu Todorov, 79, Bulgarian freestyle wrestler, Olympic silver medallist (1968).
Bill Walker, 95, Australian-born American composer and conductor.
Alan White, 72, English Hall of Fame drummer (Yes, Plastic Ono Band).
Jimmy Whitehouse, 87, English footballer (Reading).
Andrew Wyllie, 77, British pathologist.
Jan Zaprudnik, 95, Belarusian-American historian and publicist.

27
Alex Beaton, 77, Scottish folk singer and guitarist.
Guido Bonino, 91, Italian politician, president of the Province of Cuneo (1985–1988).
Jean Carrère, 92, French rugby union player (RC Toulonnais, national team).
Gautam Chakroborty, 68, Bangladeshi politician, MP (1996–2006), state minister of water resources (2001–2006), cardiac arrest.
Don Goldstein, 84, American college basketball player (University of Louisville).
Shulamit Goldstein, 54, Israeli Olympic rhythmic gymnast (1988).
Kirsten Hughes, 59, British actress (Jane and the Lost City).
Arlene Kotil, 88, American baseball player (South Bend Blue Sox).
John Lanzendorf, 76, American hairstylist and art collector, complications following surgery.
Samella Lewis, 99, American visual artist and art historian, kidney failure.
Ahmad Syafi'i Maarif, 86, Indonesian Islamic scholar and philanthropist, leader of Muhammadiyah (1998–2005), heart disease.
Juan José Mosalini, 78, Argentine bandoneon player.
Bill Mulich, 96, American politician, member of the Kansas House of Representatives (1969–1972) and senate (1973–1988).
Stellan Olsson, 85, Swedish film director (Sven Klangs kvintett).
Ray Pleasant, 94, American politician, member of the Minnesota House of Representatives (1973–1980).
Gordon Proudfoot, 91, Australian footballer (Fitzroy).
Marko Račič, 102, Slovenian Olympic athlete (1948).
Twyla Ring, 84, American politician, member of the Minnesota Senate (1999–2002).
Claude Rutault, 80, French painter.
Fayez Sarofim, 93, Egyptian-American sports team owner (Houston Texans).
Michael Sela, 98, Polish-born Israeli immunologist.
Angelo Sodano, 94, Italian Roman Catholic cardinal, cardinal secretary of state (1991–2006) and dean of the College of Cardinals (2005–2019), COVID-19.
Jim Wallis, 80, Australian footballer (St Kilda).

28
Walter Abish, 90, Austrian-born American author (Alphabetical Africa, How German Is It).
Patricia Brake, 79, English actress (Eldorado, The Ugliest Girl in Town, Coronation Street), cancer.
Evaristo Carvalho, 80, São Toméan politician, president (2016–2021) and prime minister (1994, 2001–2002).
Janine Charbonnier, 95, French pianist and composer.
Mary Everard, 79, English amateur golfer.
Rudolf Golosov, 94, Russian naval officer.
Péter Haumann, 81, Hungarian actor (Ten Thousand Days, Woyzeck, Kalandorok).
Bo Hopkins, 84, American actor (The Wild Bunch, American Graffiti, Dynasty), complications from a heart attack.
Ivandro Cunha Lima, 92, Brazilian lawyer and politician, senator (1977–1982).
Christopher Kuruneri, 73, Zimbabwean politician, minister of finance (2004), diabetes.
Marino Masé, 83, Italian actor (Fists in the Pocket, The Carabineers, Il Boss), heart attack.
Bujar Nishani, 55, Albanian politician, president (2012–2017), minister of justice (2009–2011) and twice minister of the interior, complications from COVID-19.
Masanori Nishio, 73, Japanese politician, mayor of Hakodate (2007–2011).
Yves Piétrasanta, 82, French politician, MEP (1999–2004), mayor of Mèze (1977–2001).
Bobby Ross, 80, Scottish footballer (Grimsby Town, St. Mirren, East Fife).
David Vardanyan, 72, Armenian politician, member of the supreme council (1990–1995) and national assembly (1995–1999).
Ernesto Vecchi, 86, Italian Roman Catholic prelate, auxiliary bishop of Bologna (1998–2011) and apostolic administrator of Terni-Narni-Amelia (2013–2014).
Victor von Halem, 82, German operatic bass singer (Deutsche Oper Berlin).

29
Ariel Besse, 56, French actress (Beau Pere).
Antônio Augusto Cançado Trindade, 74, Brazilian jurist, judge of the International Court of Justice (since 2009).
Dwayne Crompton, 75, American educator, president of the National Association for the Education of Young Children (2005).
Virgil Dridea, 81, Romanian football player (Petrolul Ploiești) and manager (Plopeni, Dacia Unirea Brăila).
Fred, 73, Brazilian footballer (1972 Olympic team, Flamengo, national team).
Tarzan Goto, 58, Japanese professional wrestler (FMW, CWA, AJPW), liver cancer.
Steven Gluckstern, 71, American entrepreneur.
Ronnie Hawkins, 87, American-Canadian rock and roll singer-songwriter.
Vivian Davidson Hewitt, 102, American art collector and librarian.
Ausma Kantāne-Ziedone, 80, Latvian actress and politician, MP (2002–2010).
Maria Mirecka-Loryś, 106, Polish World War II resistance member.
Joel Moses, 80, Israeli-American mathematician and computer scientist (Macsyma).
Sidhu Moose Wala, 28, Indian singer ("47"), actor (Moosa Jatt, Yes I Am Student) and politician, shot.
Osayuki Godwin Oshodin, 71, Beninese academic administrator, vice-chancellor of University of Benin (2009–2014).
Lester Piggott, 86, English jockey, nine-time Epsom Derby winner.
Sarah Ramsey, 83, American thoroughbred horse breeder.
Ivan Renar, 85, French politician, senator (1985–2011).
Alden Roche, 77, American football player (Denver Broncos, Green Bay Packers, Seattle Seahawks).
Stan Rodger, 82, New Zealand politician, MP (1978–1990), minister of labour (1984–1990).
Raquel Seruca, 59, Portuguese oncobiologist.
Kasia Al Thani, 45, American-born Qatari royal.
Yanci Urbina, 58, Salvadoran politician, deputy (2018–2021), heart attack.
Gary Winram, 85, Australian Olympic swimmer (1956).
Tony Zarb, 68, Maltese trade unionist, secretary general of General Workers' Union (1998–2015).

30
Miangul Adnan Aurangzeb, 61, Pakistani politician, MNA (1997–1999), traffic collision.
Friedrich Christian Delius, 79, German writer.
Craig Farrell, 39, English footballer (Carlisle United, York City, Whitby Town).
Jeff Gladney, 25, American football player (Minnesota Vikings, TCU Horned Frogs), traffic collision.
Milton Gonçalves, 88, Brazilian actor (Kiss of the Spider Woman, Subway to the Stars, Moon over Parador) and television director, complications from a stroke.
David Holford, 82, Barbadian cricketer (West Indies).
Mary Jackman, 79, Irish politician, senator (1989–1992, 1997–2002).
Mariusz Linke, 52, Polish mixed martial artist and grappler.
William Lucas, 93, American politician, sheriff (1969–1983) and executive (1983–1987) of Wayne County, Michigan.
Morio Matsui, 79, Japanese artist, heart disease.
Jacques Nicolaou, 91, French comic book author.
Ramses Ohee, 90, Indonesian politician.
Boris Pahor, 108, Slovenian writer (Necropolis) and Holocaust survivor.
Charles A. Rose, 91, American politician, mayor of Chattanooga (1975–1983).
Roger Shepard, 93, American cognitive scientist and author.
Costen Shockley, 80, American baseball player (Philadelphia Phillies, Los Angeles Angels).
Carlo Smuraglia, 98, Italian politician and partisan, senator (1992–2001) and president of ANPI (2011–2017).
Sir William Sutherland, 88, Scottish police officer, chief constable of Bedfordshire Police (1979–1983) and Lothian and Borders Police (1983–1996), chief inspector of constabulary of Scotland (1996–1998).
Bob Talamini, 83, American football player (Houston Oilers, New York Jets).
Sean Thackrey, 79, American winemaker, cancer.
Paul Vance, 92, American songwriter ("Catch a Falling Star", "Itsy Bitsy Teenie Weenie Yellow Polkadot Bikini", "Tracy") and record producer.
Pat Yankee, 94, American singer.

31
Lawrence D. Ackman, 83, American real estate agent.
Ahn Byong-man, 81, South Korean academic administrator, president of Hankuk University of Foreign Studies (1994–2004).
Ian Bentley, 66, English Anglican priest, archdeacon of Lynn (2018–2022), liver cancer.
Paul Brass, 85, American political scientist and academic.
Bart Bryant, 59, American golfer, traffic collision.
Maurice Cooreman, 79, Belgian football manager (Kaduna United).
Kenneth W. Dam, 89, American politician, secretary of the treasury (2002–2003).
Andrée Geulen, 100, Belgian teacher and member of the resistance.
Sir Brian Hayes, 93, British civil servant, Permanent Secretary at the Ministry of Agriculture, Fisheries and Food (1978–1983).
Larry Hillman, 85, Canadian ice hockey player (Toronto Maple Leafs, Boston Bruins, Detroit Red Wings).
Egbert Hirschfelder, 79, German rower, Olympic champion (1964, 1968).
Gregory Eebolawola Kpiebaya, 89, Ghanaian Roman Catholic prelate, bishop of Wa (1974–1994) and archbishop of Tamale (1994–2009).
KK, 53, Indian playback singer (Hum Dil De Chuke Sanam, Humraaz, Om Shanti Om), cardiac arrest.
Ingram Marshall, 80, American composer.
Jacques N'Guea, 66, Cameroonian footballer (Canon Yaoundé, national team).
Jim Parks, 90, English cricketer (Sussex, Somerset, national team), complications from a fall.
Kelly Joe Phelps, 62, American blues musician.
Vasile Rădulescu, 77, Romanian politician, deputy (1990–1992).
Zaire Rezende, 90, Brazilian politician, deputy (1991–2000), complications from COVID-19.
Gilberto Rodríguez Orejuela, 83, Colombian drug lord (Cali Cartel).
Joe Segal, 97, Canadian philanthropist.
Bhim Singh, 80, Indian politician, founder of Jammu and Kashmir National Panthers Party, MP (1988) and Jammu and Kashmir MLA (1977–1987).
Dave Smith, 72, American sound engineer, founder of Sequential.
Lawrence Zalcman, 78, American mathematician.
Wang Zherong, 86, Chinese tank designer, member of the Chinese Academy of Engineering.

References

2022-5
5